In Greek mythology, Lichas was Hercules's servant, who brought the poisoned shirt from Deianira to Hercules because of Deianira's jealousy of Iole, which killed him.

Mythology 
Lichas brought to his master the deadly garment, and as a punishment, was thrown by him into the sea, where the Lichadian islands, between Euboea and the coast of Locris, were believed to have derived their name from him. The story is recounted in Sophocles' Women of Trachis and Ovid's Metamorphoses.

Ovid's account 

Cape Lichada is said to be where Hercules flung Lichas into the sea:

So, in his frenzy, as he wandered there,he chanced upon the trembling Lichas, crouchedin the close covert of a hollow rock.Then in a savage fury he cried out,"Was it you, Lichas, brought this fatal gift?Shall you be called the author of my death?"Lichas, in terror, groveled at his feet,and begged for mercy"Only let me live!"But seizing on him, the crazed Hero whirledhim thrice and once again about his head,and hurled him, shot as by a catapult,into the waves of the Euboic Sea.Lichas was innocent but due to a big misunderstandingHercules threw in him the sea.While he was hanging in the air, his formwas hardened; as, we know, rain drops may firstbe frozen by the cold air, and then changeto snow, and as it falls through whirling windsmay press, so twisted, into round hailstones:even so has ancient lore declared that whenstrong arms hurled Lichas through the mountain airthrough fear, his blood was curdled in his veins.No moisture left in him, he was transformedinto a flint-rock. Even to this day,a low crag rising from the waves is seenout of the deep Euboean Sea, and holdsthe certain outline of a human form,so surely traced, the wary sailors fearto tread upon it, thinking it has life,and they have called it Lichas ever since. —Ovid. Metamorphoses, IX:211

Gallery

References 

Mythology of Heracles
Metamorphoses characters
Metamorphoses into terrain in Greek mythology